Marblehead Public Schools is an educational district located in Marblehead, Massachusetts. The district provides educational opportunities and facilities for students from kindergarten through high school. There are eight schools, including five elementary schools, one upper elementary, one middle, and one high school.

Schools 

Elementary schools
 Glover School
 Eveleth School
 Coffin School
 Gerry School
 Bell School
 Village School

Middle schools
 Marblehead Veterans Middle School

High schools
Marblehead High School

Notable alumni 
 Keith Ablow, former psychiatrist, pundit and talk show host.

References

External links 
 Massachusetts Department of Education profile

Education in Essex County, Massachusetts
Government of Essex County, Massachusetts
Marblehead, Massachusetts
School districts in Massachusetts
Educational institutions in the United States with year of establishment missing